Fredrick Idowu Olugbemi is an Anglican bishop in Nigeria: he is the current Bishop of Ilaje.

He has previously served as an Archdeacon and a Dean.

Notes

Living people
Anglican bishops of Ilaje
21st-century Anglican bishops in Nigeria
Year of birth missing (living people)
Church of Nigeria archdeacons